Kusev Point (‘Kusev Nos’ \'ku-sev 'nos\) is the point forming the north extremity of Pickwick Island and the west side of the entrance to Misionis Bay in the Pitt group of Biscoe Islands, Antarctica.

The point is named after Metropolitan Metodiy Kusev (1838-1922), a leader in the struggle for Bulgarian Church autocephaly and national unification.

Location
British mapping in 1971.

Maps
 British Antarctic Territory: Graham Coast.  Scale 1:200000 topographic map.  DOS 610 Series, Sheet W 65 64.  Directorate of Overseas Surveys, UK, 1971.
 Antarctic Digital Database (ADD). Scale 1:250000 topographic map of Antarctica. Scientific Committee on Antarctic Research (SCAR). Since 1993, regularly upgraded and updated.

References
 Bulgarian Antarctic Gazetteer. Antarctic Place-names Commission. (details in Bulgarian, basic data in English)
 Kusev Point. SCAR Composite Antarctic Gazetteer.

External links
 Kusev Point. Copernix satellite image

Headlands of the Biscoe Islands
Bulgaria and the Antarctic